The River Valley is a c. 1626-1630 painting by the Dutch artist Hercules Seghers (ca. 1589/90-1640). It is now in the Rijksmuseum, in Amsterdam, which acquired it in May 1931.

References

1620s paintings
Landscape paintings
Dutch Golden Age paintings
Paintings in the collection of the Rijksmuseum